Richard Searle is a bass guitarist.

Richard Searle may also refer to:
 Richard Searle (Sussex cricketer) (1789–?), cricketer for Sussex
 Richard Searle (Queensland cricketer) (born 1934), cricketer for Queensland